Rahat Fateh Ali Khan is a Pakistani singer, who has sung several songs in Pakistan and India, including the Pakistani film and drama industries, as well as Coke Studio and Bollywood. He is a well-known Qawwali singer, and has also sung many national songs and ghazals.

Albums

Studio albums

Compilations and collaborations

Soundtracks

Pakistani TV serials

Pakistani film

Indian films

Replaced Songs

Singles

Pakistani

Coke Studio (Pakistan)

Other music videos and collaborations

Extra notes

See also

List of awards and nominations received by Rahat Fateh Ali Khan

References

External links
[ Rahat Fateh Ali Khan Biography] All Music Guide

Discography
Discographies of Pakistani artists
Pop music discographies
Rock music discographies